Plusiocalpe micans is a moth of the family Nolidae first described by Max Saalmüller in 1891. It is found in Madagascar. The wingspan of the adult moths is 24–29 mm.

References

Nolidae
Lepidoptera of Madagascar
Moths described in 1891
Moths of Madagascar
Moths of Africa